Dean Henry Detton (June 27, 1908 – February 23, 1958) was an American professional wrestler and World Heavyweight Champion who was active in the early portion of the twentieth century. Previously he was a proficient University of Utah football player. Detton was born in Richmond, Utah and raised Mormon. He retired from wrestling in 1951 and then ran a bar, The Turf Club, where he eventually hanged himself to death. For his last 14 years he had lived in Hayward, California.

Championships and accomplishments 
 50th State Big Time Wrestling
NWA Hawaii Heavyweight Championship
 California State Athletic Commission
 World Heavyweight Championship (Los Angeles version) (1 time)
 New York State Athletic Commission
New York State Athletic Commission World Heavyweight Championship (1 time)
 NWA New Zealand
NWA New Zealand Heavyweight Championship
 Other titles
World Heavyweight Championship (1 time)

See also
 List of premature professional wrestling deaths

References

External links
 

1908 births
1958 deaths
American male professional wrestlers
People from Richmond, Utah
Professional wrestlers from Utah
University of Utah alumni